The 2014–15 Nevada Wolf Pack men's basketball team represented the University of Nevada, Reno during the 2014–15 NCAA Division I men's basketball season. The Wolf Pack, led by sixth year head coach David Carter, played their home games at the Lawlor Events Center and were members of the Mountain West Conference. They finished season 9–22, 5–13 in Mountain West play to finish in tenth place. They lost in the first round of the Mountain West tournament to UNLV.

At the end of the season, head coach David Carter was fired. He compiled a record of 98–97 in six seasons.

Previous season 
The Wolf Pack finished the season 15–17, 10–8 in Mountain West play to finish in a tie for third place. They lost in the quarterfinals of the Mountain West tournament to Boise State.

Departures

Incoming Transfers

Recruiting

Roster

Schedule

|-
!colspan=9 style="background:#002E62; color:#C8C9CB;"| Exhibition

|-
!colspan=9 style="background:#002E62; color:#C8C9CB;"| Regular season

|-
!colspan=9 style="background:#002E62; color:#C8C9CB;"| Mountain West tournament

References

Nevada Wolf Pack men's basketball seasons
Nevada
Nevada Wolf Pack
Nevada Wolf Pack